The First Federal Electoral District of Baja California Sur (I Distrito Electoral Federal de Baja California Sur) is one of the 300 Electoral Districts into which Mexico is divided for the purpose of elections to the federal Chamber of Deputies and one of two such districts in the state of Baja California Sur.

It elects one deputy to the lower house of Congress for each three-year legislative period, by means of the first past the post system.

District territory
It comprises the municipalities of Comondú, Loreto, Mulegé, and the westernmost two-thirds of the municipality of La Paz.

The district's head town (cabecera distrital), where results from individual polling stations are gathered together and collated, is the city of Santa Rosalía, Baja California Sur.

Previous districting schemes
Before Baja California Sur acquired statehood in 1974 and was still a Federal Territory, it was entitled to return only one deputy to Congress; the district known as the Sole District of the Southern Territory of Baja California (Distrito único del Territorio Sur de Baja California) therefore covered the whole of modern-day Baja California Sur. The state's First Federal Electoral District is considered the successor of the territory's Sole District.

Deputies returned to Congress from this district

XLIV Legislature
 1958–1961: Alejandro Martínez Rodríguez (PRI)
XLV Legislature
 1961–1964: Antonio Navarro Encinas (PRI)
XLVI Legislature
 1964–1967: Alberto Alvarado Arámburo (PRI)
XLVII Legislature
 1967–1970:
XLVIII Legislature
 1970–1973:
XLIX Legislature
 1973–1976:
L Legislature
 1976–1979: Víctor Manuel Peralta Osuna (PRI)
LI Legislature
 1979–1982: Armando Trasviña Taylor (PRI)
LII Legislature
 1982–1985:
LIII Legislature
 1985–1988: Víctor Manuel Liceaga Ruibal (PRI)
LIV Legislature
 1988–1991:
LV Legislature
 1991–1993: Guillermo Mercado Romero (PRI)
 1993–1994: Yolanda Robinson Manríquez (PRI)
LVI Legislature
 1994–1997: Leonel Cota Montaño (PRI)
LVII Legislature
 1997–2000: José Carlos Cota Osuna (PRI)
LVIII Legislature
 2000–2003: Miguel Vega Pérez (PRI)
LIX Legislature
 2003–2006: Francisco Javier Obregón Espinoza (PRD)
LX Legislature
 2006–2009: Juan Adolfo Orcí Martínez (PRD)

See also

Federal electoral districts of Mexico
Government of Baja California Sur
La Paz Municipality (Baja California Sur)
Loreto Municipality (Baja California Sur)
Mulegé Municipality